Vöhringen can refer to several places:

 Vöhringen, Bavaria, a town in Germany
 Vöhringen, Baden-Württemberg, a municipality in  Germany